is a Shinto shrine located in Minato, Tokyo.
It enshrines Ukanomitama (Inari Ōkami), Ame-no-Uzume and Ninigi-no-Mikoto.

History
It was established in 940, the third year of the Tengyō era.

Gallery

See also

 List of Shinto shrines

References

 Website of Tokyo-Jinjacho (in Japanese)

External links
 Website of Karasumorijinja (in Japanese)

Monuments and memorials in Japan
Shinto shrines in Tokyo
State Shinto